The following are international rankings of the Nicaragua.

Economic
 The Wall Street Journal:  Index of Economic Freedom: 2006; 2007 , ranked 61 out of 157 countries
 World Economic Forum: Global Competitiveness Report 2006-2007 Growth Competitiveness Index ranked 95 out of 125 countries
 GDP growth rate ranked 175 out of 215 2.5% growth rate (2006)
Nominal GDP ranked 127 out of 183 (2005)
Per capita GDP ranked 128 out of 194
Unemployment rate ranked 40 of 197 with 3.9% unemployment (2008)
Third lowest in Central America
 World Bank Ease of Doing Business Index 2006: ranked 117 of 183 countries.
8(Previously ranked 67th in 2006)

Environmental
 Yale University Center for Environmental Law and Policy and Columbia University Center for International Earth Science Information Network: Index of Environmental Sustainability Index 2005, ranked 66 out of 146 countries.
 United Nations: Carbon dioxide emissions 2006 ranked 119 out of 182 countries.
Third lowest in Latin America

General
 United Nations: Human Development Index 2006, ranked 124 out of 177 countries
 Population (2009) ranked 107 out of 223 countries. 5,743,000 people, 0.084% of world's population (UN estimate.)

Political
 Reporters Without Borders: Worldwide Press freedom Index 2006, ranked 69 out of 167 countries
 Reporters Without Borders: Worldwide Press freedom Index 2007, ranked 47 out of 169 countries

Other

References

Nicaragua